Jackson Hall may refer to:

United Kingdom 
 Jackson Hall, Cardiff, a Grade II listed building in Cardiff, Wales

United States 
 Andrew Jackson Hall in the Tennessee Performing Arts Center, Nashville, Tennessee
 Jackson Hall in the Mondavi Center, a performing arts venue located on the UC Davis campus, California
 Jackson Hall (University of Minnesota), a building on the campus of the University of Minnesota
 Jackson City Hall, the seat of municipal government in Jackson, Mississippi
 Jackson Hall, a building at Kentucky State University in Frankfort, Kentucky